Jacob Matthew Blyth (14 August 1992) is an English professional footballer who plays as a forward for Bradford (Park Avenue).

Early life
Blyth was educated at St. Thomas More School & Technical College in his home town of Nuneaton.

Career

Early career
He started his playing career at local league side Bermuda F.C. Entrance to the football league pyramid football followed when he played for Nuneaton Griff of the Midland Football Combination. Further moves up the pyramid followed when he switched to Bedworth United and then in January 2011 to Leamington of the Southern League Premier Division.

Leicester City
In May 2012 the 19-year-old forward was taken on by Leicester City of the EFL Championship on professional terms for an undisclosed fee.

loan moves
After scoring 6 goals in 11 appearances for the club's Under 21 Development Squad he was allowed to move to Burton Albion of League Two to gain first team experience. Blyth made his Football League debut the day afterwards on 20 November 2012 as a 78th minute substitute against Aldershot Town. On 13 February 2013 he joined League One Notts County on a month's loan.

Following a successful first season playing for Leicester City Development Squad & Academy, finishing as top scorer, Blyth signed a new contract with the club on 1 May 2013.

On 9 August 2013, Blyth joined Northampton Town on a one-month loan deal. Making his debut on 10 August 2013 in a League Two game against Newport County at Sixfields, Blyth scored with a 25th-minute header, the first goal in a 3–1 win for Northampton. On 10 September, Blyth extended his stay at Northampton until November following an impressive spell scoring twice in six appearances. His loan spell was cut short by injury and he returned to Leicester on 3 October.

On 6 November 2013, Blyth re-joined Northampton Town on loan until the middle of December 2013.

Blyth extended his contract at Leicester for a further two years on 2 June 2014.

On 27 August 2014, Blyth re-joined Burton Albion on loan until January 2015. Blyth made his second Burton debut in the 1–0, League Cup, giant-killing against Premier League side Queens Park Rangers on the same day he made his switch to the Brewers. Blyth scored his first goal of his loan in the 3–1 loss to Bury on 20 September 2014.

On 21 August 2015, Blyth signed for Cambridge United on a one-month loan deal.

On 22 March 2016, Blyth joined Blackpool on loan until the end of the 2015–16 season.

Motherwell
After being released by Leicester, Blyth signed for Scottish Premiership club Motherwell on 23 June 2016, agreeing a two-year contract with the option of a third year. On 8 August 2017, Blyth left Motherwell by mutual consent.

Barrow
On 26 June 2018, Blyth became the first signing for new Barrow boss Ian Evatt. During a pre-season game against Furness Select on 7 July 2018, Blyth collided with an advertising banner and wall, causing what at the time appeared to be a broken arm, but later turned out to only be a dislocated shoulder. The match was called off at the request of Ian Evatt due to a long delay whilst waiting for an ambulance for Blyth. He scored his first two league goals for the club on 29 December 2018 in a 3–2 win against Salford City.

Macclesfield Town
On 1 July 2019, Blyth signed for League Two club Macclesfield Town on a one-year contract.

Altrincham
On 26 December 2020, Blyth signed for National League side Altrincham. On 4 January 2021, Blyth was released by Altrincham after playing just three league games for the club.

Gateshead
On 16 January 2021, Blyth signed for National League North side Gateshead on a contract until the end of the 2020–21 season.

Oldham Athletic
In August 2021 signed to Oldham Athletic on a short-term deal. He was released later that month after failing to impress in the 3 games he played.

Chorley
In September 2021, Blyth joined National League North club Chorley.

Bradford (Park Avenue)
On 29 June 2022, Blyth joined fellow National League North club Bradford (Park Avenue) on a one-year deal.

Personal life
Blyth is married to Geordie Shore star Holly Hagan. In January 2023 the couple announced they were expecting their first child.

References

External links

1992 births
Living people
Sportspeople from Nuneaton
Association football forwards
English footballers
Nuneaton Griff F.C. players
Bedworth United F.C. players
Leamington F.C. players
Leicester City F.C. players
Burton Albion F.C. players
Notts County F.C. players
Northampton Town F.C. players
Cambridge United F.C. players
Blackpool F.C. players
Motherwell F.C. players
Barrow A.F.C. players
Macclesfield Town F.C. players
Altrincham F.C. players
Gateshead F.C. players
Oldham Athletic A.F.C. players
Chorley F.C. players
Bradford (Park Avenue) A.F.C. players
English Football League players
Scottish Professional Football League players
National League (English football) players